194 Squadron RAF, though formed as a training unit in Egypt and ended as a casualty evacuation unit in Malaya, was for most of its active service life a RAF transport squadron that flew in South East Asia.

History

Formation and World War I
Formed as a training squadron in No. 20 Group (or No. 32 Group) at RAF El Amiriya in Egypt on 9 August 1917, it disbanded on 21 July 1918 into No. 16 Training Depot Station.

World War II

No. 194 Squadron was reformed at RAF Lahore, Punjab on 13 October 1942 as a transport unit equipped with Hudsons. It maintained mail and passenger routes in India until it became an airborne forces squadron in September 1943. Douglas Dakotas had started to arrive in May and, with the departure of the last Hudsons in September, No. 194 began paratroop training. In February 1944, supply-dropping flights to Chindit army units in Burma began and continued for the rest of the war. In January 1945 a casualty evacuation flight was attached to the squadron and Stinson Sentinels were used to pick up casualties form small jungle strips. After the end of the war, the squadron was engaged in general transport duties until disbanding at Mingladon on 15 February 1946. The squadron badge commonly used by the squadron depicted a flying elephant and the Squadron had adopted the motto ‘The Friendly Firm’ and although their entire fleet of aircraft carried this crest throughout the Burma campaign, Royal Charter never officially recognized it (That same crest can be seen on all three books about the squadron).

Post-war
On 1 February 1953, No. 194 reformed for a second time at Sembawang in Malaya from the Casualty Evacuation Flight with Westland Dragonfly HC.2 helicopters for co-operation with security forces in Malaya. Bristol Sycamore HC.14s were received in October 1954, but it was June 1956 before the last Dragonfly left. On 3 June 1959, the squadron merged with No. 155 Squadron RAF to become No. 110 Squadron RAF.

Aircraft operated

Squadron bases

Commanding officers

References
Notes

Bibliography

 Briscoe, Deryk A. (ed.) The Friendly Firm Remembers: Stories by the members of the 194 Squadron in South East Asia. Victoria, British Columbia, Canada: Windrush Marketing, 2000. .
 Delve, Ken. The Source Book of the RAF. Shrewsbury, Shropshire, UK: Airlife Publishing, 1994. .
 Halley, James J. The Squadrons of the Royal Air Force & Commonwealth 1918–1988. Tonbridge, Kent, UK: Air Britain (Historians) Ltd., 1988. .
 Jefford, Wing CommanderC.G. RAF Squadrons, a Comprehensive record of the Movement and Equipment of all RAF Squadrons and their Antecedents since 1912. Shrewsbury, Shropshire, UK: Airlife Publishing, 1988 (second edition 2001). .
 Rawlings, John D.R. Coastal, Support and Special Squadrons of the RAF and their Aircraft. London: Jane's Publishing Company Ltd., 1982. .
 Russell, Wilfrid. The Friendly Firm – A history of 194 Squadron, Royal AIr Force. London, 194 Squadron RAF Association, 1972.
 Sturtivant, Ray with John Hamlin.  RAF Flying Training and Support Units since 1912. Staplefield, West Sussex, UK: Air-Britain (Historians) Ltd., 2007. .
 Williams, Flight Lieutenant Douglas. 194 Squadron Royal AIr Force – 'The Friendly Firm' (Burma Campaign). Braunton, Devon, UK: Merlin Books Ltd., 1987. .

External links

 The History of the Burma Star Association

194
Military units and formations established in 1917
1917 establishments in Egypt
N